Kladešćica is an uninhabited naselje (settlement) in the town of Sveti Ivan Zelina in Zagreb County, Croatia.

References

Former populated places in Croatia